Vivino is a surname. Notable people with the surname include:

Donna Vivino (born 1978), American musical theater actress and singer
Floyd Vivino (born 1951), American actor
Jerry Vivino (born 1954), American musician
Jimmy Vivino (born 1955), American musician, singer, and producer